The All-Atlantic Coast Conference (ACC) men's basketball team is an annual Atlantic Coast Conference honor bestowed on the best players in the conference following every college basketball season. The selections started in the ACC inaugural season in 1953–54. At the end of the season, ten players were nominated in two teams (first and second team) as the best of the season. Since the 1989–90 season, three teams were nominated, for a total of 15 players. On some occasions (for example, 1997, 2000 and 2006), six players were selected for one of the teams, bringing the number of total selections to 16.

Players are listed by number of votes, with the player who received the most votes listed first.
This list is wrong; Vince Yockel of Clemson was 2nd team in 1956 and 1st team in 1958.

Selections

1953–1959

1960–1969

1970–1979

1980–1989

1990–1999

2000–2009

2010–2019

2020–present

References

External links 
All-Atlantic Coast Conference Winners at Sports-Reference.com
 

All-ACC
Lists of college men's basketball players in the United States
All-Atlantic Coast Conference
Awards established in 1954